Bad Kleinen (until 1915 Kleinen) is a municipality in the Nordwestmecklenburg district, in Mecklenburg-Vorpommern, Germany. It is located on the north bank of the Schweriner See. Bad Kleinen is part of the Hamburg Metropolitan Region.

Geography
The municipality is located on the north bank of the Schweriner See, the fourth largest lake in Germany, and about half-way between the state capital Schwerin and Hanseatic city of Wismar, and close to Lübeck. The famous German Philosopher and Mathematician Gottlob Frege (*8 November 1848 Wismar – †26 July 1925 Bad Kleinen) lived in Bad Kleinen. In his honor every year during Spring, the people of Nordwestmecklenburg make a walking tour between Wismar (Frege's Birthplace) and Bad Kleinen. The current mayor of Bad Kleinen is Joachim Wölm.

History
During police action on 27 June 1993 German federal police officer Michael Newrzella and the Red Army Faction member Wolfgang Grams were killed on the platform of Bad Kleinen station.

References

Nordwestmecklenburg
Grand Duchy of Mecklenburg-Schwerin